Pablo Nieto Aguilar (born 4 June 1980 in Madrid, Community of Madrid) is a Spanish former Grand Prix motorcycle road racer currently involved in team management. He is the son of the legendary Spanish motorcycle racer Ángel Nieto, and cousin of Fonsi Nieto. He started to race professionally in 1998, and spent his career in the 125cc class. Following the race at Valencia in 2008 he announced his retirement from racing, to move to a managerial position of the Onde 2000 MotoGP team with Sete Gibernau in 2009 as the team's only rider. He was the team manager for the Laglisse Moto3 team from 2012-2014, in the 2013 Moto3 Grand Prix season, his rider Maverick Viñales won the championship. He is now the team manager for Valentino Rossi's SKY Racing Team VR46 team.

Grand Prix motorcycle racing career

Races by year
(key) (Races in bold indicate pole position, races in italics indicate fastest lap)

References

External links
Pablo Nieto Official Website

1980 births
Living people
Sportspeople from Madrid
Spanish motorcycle racers
125cc World Championship riders